Pseudopegolettia is a genus of flowering plants belonging to the family Asteraceae.

Its native range is Southern Tropical and Southern Africa.

Species:

Pseudopegolettia tenella 
Pseudopegolettia thodei

References

Asteraceae
Asteraceae genera